Xarrë (Albanian pronunciation:  or ;) is a village and a former municipality in the Vlorë County, southern Albania. At the 2015 local government reform it became a subdivision of the municipality Konispol. The population at the 2011 census was 4,263. The municipal unit consists of the villages Xarrë, Mursi, Shkallë and Vrinë.

Municipal demographics 
The village of Xarrë is inhabited by an Orthodox Albanian majority, Muslim Albanian Chams (200) that arrived from northern Greece in the 1920s and 1940s, a combined population of Aromanians and Greeks (50) and some Romani. Mursi is inhabited by an Orthodox Albanian majority, alongside a few Muslim Albanians and Greeks. Shkallë is inhabited by an Aromanian majority, alongside a few Muslim Albanians and Greeks and also contains a few families of Muslim Romani originally from Filiates, Greece who following the exodus of the Cham Albanians in 1944-1945 settled in the region. Vrinë is a new village established during the communist period and is populated by Albanians (718) and Greeks (300).

References

Former municipalities in Vlorë County
Administrative units of Konispol
Villages in Vlorë County
Aromanian settlements in Albania